Hotel Ukraina, also branded and marketed as the Radisson Collection Hotel, Moscow, is a five-star luxury hotel in the city centre of Moscow, on a bend of the Moskva River. It is the tallest hotel in Russia, the tallest hotel in Europe, and the 52nd-tallest hotel in the world. It is a Radisson Collection hotel, managed by the Rezidor Hotel Group.

History 
Hotel Ukraina was commissioned by Joseph Stalin. It was designed by Arkady Mordvinov and Vyacheslav Oltarzhevsky (the leading Soviet expert on steel-framed highrise construction), and is the second tallest of the neoclassical Stalin-era "seven sisters" (with 34 stories). It was the tallest hotel in the world from the time of its construction until the Westin Peachtree Plaza Hotel opened in Atlanta, Georgia, United States in 1976. Construction on the low river bank meant that the builders had to dig well below the water level. This was enabled by an ingenious water retention system, using a perimeter of needle pumps driven deep into the ground.

History 
Domestic architects began to actively discuss the possibility of building high-rise buildings in Moscow after the 1917 revolution. Very shortly thereafter, there were many interesting projects; for example, the skyscraper project of the Supreme Economic Council building on the Lubyanka Square, designed by Vladimir Krinsky in 1923. In the same year, the Vesnin brothers proposed a project for the Palace of Labor, whose high-rise building was a tower 132 meters high.

The government supported the desires of architects to rebuild the capital of the Soviet Union. In 1940, architect Dmitry Chechulin published a draft of a 24-story public building on the Dorogomilovsky Bend of the Moscow River - the hotel "Ukraine" subsequently appeared at this place. The sketches were published in Issues 11–14 of the magazine Construction of Moscow. All the preparatory work on this project progressed very slowly, and with the start of World War II, work was completely frozen.

High-rise project 
On January 13, 1947, the Secretary of the Central Committee of the CPSU (b), Joseph Stalin, signed the resolution of the Council of Ministers of the USSR "On the Construction of High-Rise Buildings in Moscow". Clause 4 stated that a 26-story building with a hotel and residences  was to be built on the Leningradskoye Highway near the Dynamo Stadium. 

Mordvinov, as a representative of the Committee on Architectural Affairs, examined the project and submitted the construction plan to the government for approval. Construction work was transferred to the Ministry of Construction of Heavy Industry Enterprises. The design of the hotel was entrusted to architects Arkady Mordvinov, Vyacheslav Oltarzhevsky and chief designer Pavel Krasilnikov.

In the future, the government decided to transfer the construction to the Dorogomilovskaya settlement, which was built up with barracks and wooden houses. This was due to the desire to create a high-rise which would dominate  the intersection of the Moskva River embankment and a promising major highway,  Kutuzov Avenue. The designers took into account not only the location of the roads, a pier for the river fleet was also created near the hotel.

Stalinist skyscrapers of the same time were not built in a separate area; they were distributed mainly in the historical center of the capital. New high-rises should serve as architectural dominants of the capital. Church belltowers and domes performed a similar role in pre-revolutionary Moscow. The chief architect of Moscow, Dmitry Chechulin, also took into account that future skyscrapers could “overlap” with each other.

Construction 
Like all skyscrapers built in the Stalinist era, the first stone of the hotel was solemnly laid on September 7, 1947, on the day of the 800th anniversary of Moscow, but work did not actually begin until 1953. The construction of high-rise buildings in Moscow was complicated by three circumstances. The first problem was weak Moscow soil (sandy loam), for which reason it was necessary to build strong foundations. The second difficulty was that the Soviet experts, except Oltarzhevsky and a few other architects, did not have the relevant expertise. Finally, the country lacked the necessary technical base.

Considering Stalin's attention to the project, the necessary technologies and mechanisms were developed for high-rise construction from scratch or improved. Especially for Stalin's skyscrapers, an original “box foundation” was developed, which allowed the building to be erected without gigantic reinforced concrete massifs and vertical sedimentary joints. The workers received a concrete pump capable of pumping fresh mortar to a height of 40 meters, UBK tower cranes with a lifting capacity of 15 tons, capable of lifting themselves from floor to floor as the building grows. During the construction of the hotel, these cranes were used in the construction of walls and for the installation of large elements of reinforcement blocks. In addition, with the formwork of the bottom slab of the foundation, the crane pedestals were part of the reinforced concrete structure of the building and subsequently became part of the basement. In Lyubertsy and Kuchin, special factories for the production of reinforced concrete slabs were organized, and the use of a metal frame required the creation of new wall materials: “multi-hole” bricks and hollow ceramic stones. An enterprise was set up in the village of Kudinovo to produce these materials.
Since the hotel was built later than other Stalinist skyscrapers, engineers and ordinary specialists took into account previous experience in order to optimize the workflow. At the construction site, most cargo delivery operations were mechanized from the moment they arrived at the facility until transportation to the workplace.

The building was erected in close proximity to the Moskva River, therefore, additional work was needed to drain the soil around the future foundation. Engineers applied an efficient and relatively inexpensive method. A double-point needle filter installation was created around the pit: a sequence of pipes immersed in wells and connected to the suction manifold. This made it possible to work in absolutely dry soil at minimal cost.

Long before the commissioning of the building, it became known that by order of Nikita Khrushchev, the first secretary of the Central Committee of the CPSU, the hotel would be called “Ukraine” and not “Dorogomilovskaya” (the design name is “Hotel building in Dorogomilov”) as originally intended. The reason was the desire to make a symbolic gesture in the context of the celebration in 1954 of the 300th anniversary of the reunification of Russia and Ukraine

Opening and operation 
The grand opening of the hotel on Dorogomilovskaya Embankment took place on May 25, 1957.  The Soviet press widely covered this event. In early June, the newspaper “For the cultural trade” noted that in “Ukraine” – the largest hotel in Europe – there are 1,026 rooms. The Kalininsky bridge opened in the same year connected Dorogomilovo with the center of the city and shortened the way to the hotel.

"Ukraine" was considered prestigious and was focused primarily on the placement of foreigners. Immediately after the opening, guests of the VI World Festival of Youth and Students stayed in it. In 1961, the delegates of the I World Youth Forum and the students settled in the hotel in the struggle for national independence and liberation.

In 1964, a 10-meter monument to the Ukrainian poet Taras Shevchenko was erected in the square in front of the main facade of the building. Sculptors Mikhail Gritsyuk, Yu. L. Sinkevich, A. S. Fuzhenko and architects A. A. Snitsaryov, Yu. A. Chekanuk worked on the monument.

Architecture and style 

In the 1930s, a new architectural style was formed in the Soviet Union, later called the Stalinist Empire style. Its characteristic features were the massiveness of buildings and the abundance of decorative elements, even on residential buildings. The decoration was eclectic: along with the use of classical orders, modern symbols were used, such as images of sickles, five-pointed stars and generalized images of Soviet workers.
 
According to the richness and character of the architectural composition, this is not only an image of a hotel – it is a monument of the greatness of the Stalin era architect Oltarzhevsky

According to Oltarzhevsky, even the steps that led from the embankment to the river pier were monumental. Most of the building outside is lined with ceramic blocks, the first two floors are limestone, and the basement and the main entrance are granite. Corner towers adorn wheat sheaves and flowerpots stylized as sheaves. The interiors were decorated with paintings by Soviet artists; a total of 1,200 canvases. On the ceiling in the central hall a picturesque ceiling “The Feast of Labor and Harvest in the Hospitable Ukraine” was created.

Taking into account the 73-meter spire the maximum height of the building is 206 meters. "Ukraine" is in terms of U-shaped building. The central building is occupied by the hotel itself, and in the side buildings with variable number of floors from 9 to 11 there are 255 apartments with 2–4-room apartments. In addition, there were two five-room apartments in the building. The tower of the central building has 34 floors. The hotel differed exclusively expensive decoration. Initially, there were rooms of different levels: from a single room of 12 m² to three-room suites, each of which had a living room and two bedrooms with separate bathrooms. In addition to the luxurious interiors, the hallmark of "Ukraine" has become a winter garden with a fountain, arranged on the second floor. In the building of the hotel there was a post office, telegraph, savings bank and several shops – book, flower and theater. Since the opening of the hotel, there was a closed cafe on the upper floors, around which there was an open terrace with a panoramic view of the city. The hotel employed 800 people.

The building had advanced engineering systems. In addition to the ventilation system, there was centralized air conditioning. The air from the street was filtered and moistened, its temperature reached 15 °C. The whole building was equipped with a centralized dust removal system, which was a system of brushes and hoses located in each room and in each apartment. On pipes laid along the building, the dust fell into the vacuum cleaner station installed in the basement. The collected dust was filtered and discharged into the sewage system, and the purified air from the system got into the street. The hotel was additionally equipped with hand-held vacuum cleaners. To ensure the heating of the building in the basement were boilers. Also in the hotel building was a telephone station with 10,000 numbers.

Facilities 
The hotel has 505 rooms, 38 apartments, 5 restaurants, a conference centre, executive floor, banquet hall, library, spa & wellness centre with 50m indoor swimming pool, and a fleet of Moskva River yachts.

Art collection 
There are also about 1,200 original paintings by the most prominent Russian artists of the first half of the 20th century, and on the first floor the diorama Moscow – Capital of the USSR in 1:75 scale shows the historical centre of Moscow and the city's surroundings from Luzjniki to Zemlyanoi Val in the year 1977, when the artwork was created.

Ownership 
The hotel was acquired by billionaire property investor God Nisanov for £59 million during an auction in 2005. He co-owns it with Zarakh Iliev. It closed in 2007 for a complete renovation and restoration.

In 2009, the owners signed a contract with the Rezidor Hotel Group to manage the hotel as the Radisson Royal Hotel, Moscow. The hotel maintains its original name, however, for some purposes. The hotel reopened on April 28, 2010, after its 3-year-renovation. The façade was restored in detail, while modern technology has been added, including multi-level water cleaning systems and air circulation systems. The hotel moved to Radisson's elite Radisson Collection division in January 2019, and was renamed Radisson Collection Hotel, Moscow.

Notes

References

External links 
 Hotel Ukraina official website
 Radisson Collection Hotel, Moscow official website

Hotels in Moscow
Radisson Hotels
Hotels built in the Soviet Union
Stalinist architecture
Hotel buildings completed in 1953
Skyscraper hotels in Russia
Skyscrapers in Moscow
Hotels established in 1953
Seven Sisters (Moscow)
Residential skyscrapers in Moscow
Rezidor Hotel Group
Cultural heritage monuments of regional significance in Moscow